The 2017–18 First Professional Football League was the 94th season of the top division of the Bulgarian football league system, the 70th since a league format was adopted for the national competition of A Group as a top tier of the pyramid and also the 2nd season of the First Professional Football League, which decides the Bulgarian champion. The season is the second with a new league structure and strict financial criteria where 14 clubs play each other home and away, until the league is split up in championship and relegation playoffs. The new league structure, inspired by the ones used by the Belgian First Division A and Danish Superliga, was approved by the Bulgarian Football Union on 6 June 2016. The fixture list was released on 22 June 2017.

On 29 April 2018, four rounds before the end of the championship, Ludogorets Razgrad managed to secure the title for a seventh consecutive and overall time.

Teams
A total of 14 teams would be contesting the league. Etar were promoted as champions of the 2016–17 Second League, sealing their title on the final day of the season with a 2–2 away draw against Nesebar, coupled with Septemvri Sofia's 0–2 away defeat to Oborishte. The promoted club replaced Lokomotiv Gorna Oryahovitsa, who suffered an immediate return to the second tier after elimination in the relegation play-offs by Montana.

Septemvri Sofia, runners-up of the 2016–17 Second League, won the play-off against Montana and return to the top flight after an 18-year absence, for the first time since the 1998–99 season. Montana return to the second tier after two seasons in the top flight.

Vitosha Bistritsa, who finished 3rd in the 2016–17 Second League, defeated Neftochimic in the play-off and won promotion to the top division for the first time in their history. Neftochimic spent only one season in the First League.

Stadia and locations

Note: From the 2016–17 season onwards, all participating clubs are required to have electric floodlights and adequate pitch conditions under the BFU and TV broadcaster's new licensing criteria.  The following stadiums below have either obtained a license under UEFA's category ranking or fulfill the licensing criteria.

a.Cherno More played their first home match at Kavarna Stadium in Kavarna due to ongoing renovation works at their Ticha Stadium.
b.Etar played their first two home matches at Lovech Stadium in Lovech due to ongoing renovation works at their Ivaylo Stadium.
c.Septemvri Sofia will play at the Vasil Levski National Stadium because their Dragalevtsi Stadium is not licensed for First League.
d.Slavia Sofia obtained permission from the Bulgarian Football Union to use their own stadium and will play their matches at the Vasil Levski National Stadium only when floodlights are necessary.

Personnel and sponsorship
Note: Flags indicate national team as has been defined under FIFA eligibility rules. Players and managers may hold more than one non-FIFA nationality.

Note: Individual clubs may wear jerseys with advertising. However, only one sponsorship is permitted per jersey for official tournaments organised by UEFA in addition to that of the kit manufacturer (exceptions are made for non-profit organisations).
Clubs in the domestic league can have more than one sponsorship per jersey which can feature on the front of the shirt, incorporated with the main sponsor or in place of it; or on the back, either below the squad number or on the collar area. Shorts also have space available for advertisement.

Managerial changes

1.No license for First League.

Regular season

League table

Results

Positions by round

Results by round

Championship round
Points and goals will carry over in full from regular season.

Positions by round
Below the positions per round are shown. As teams did not all start with an equal number of points, the initial pre-playoffs positions are also given.

Relegation round
Points and goals will carry over in full from regular season.

Group A

Group B

European play-offs

Bracket

European play-off quarter-finals

European play-off semi-finals

European play-off final

Relegation play-offs

Bracket

Winners of matches 3, 5 and 6 will play in the top division next season

First round

Second round

Pirin Blagoevgrad are relegated to the Second League.

Third round

Season statistics

Top scorers

Notes

Hat-tricks

Clean sheets

Notes

Transfers
 List of Bulgarian football transfers summer 2017
 List of Bulgarian football transfers winter 2017–18

References

External links
First League (uefa.com)
bulgarian-football.com

2017-18
Bul
1